Xneelo (Pty) Ltd formerly Hetzner (Pty) Ltd is a web hosting company based in South Africa. It was sometimes called Hetzner South Africa to distinguish it from the German partner company Hetzner Online GmbH. The company announced a rebrand to xneelo in July 2019.

History
Hetzner South Africa was co-founded in 1999 by Hans Wencke and Martin Hetzner. Its headquarters are located in Cape Town with data centre facilities in Samrand (Gauteng) and Newlands (Cape Town).

In March 2000, Hetzner's hosting accounts were transferred to co-located servers in the (then) UUNET data centre, Great Westerford Building, Newlands, Cape Town. In 2003, the company established its head office at Frazzitta Business Park, Durbanville. In 2004, the company established a data centre in Gauteng.

In 2009, Hetzner hosted over 130,000 domains for approximately 25,000 SME customers. In January 2013, Hetzner was appointed as an accredited Registrar to better facilitate the administration of .co.za domains.

In June 2014, Hetzner started offering colocation services in Johannesburg for customers wanting complete control over their hardware and server administration.

In March 2016, Hetzner became the second South African host of the Johannesburg Internet Exchange (JINX) and the first to receive a 10Gbit/s connection upgrade.

Hetzner (Pty) Ltd is quite different from its German namesake and partner company, Hetzner Online GmbH. The two are separate companies within their own rights, registered and incorporated under their applicable country laws. The companies do not have the same shareholders.

In July 2019, the company announced its international expansion plans and a rebranding to xneelo.

Products and services
xneelo provides web hosting solutions to the Southern African market with associated hosting products such as colocation hosting and root server hosting.

Awards
 2015 – National Business awards finalist
 2014 – South African Frost & Sullivan Market Leadership Award
 2019 – Two Silver Stevie Awards for Customer Service
2020 – A triple finalist in the 2020 international Stevie Awards for Customer Service
2021 – Stevie awards - Gold Winners for Customer Service Department of the Year - Consumer Products & Services

References

Information technology companies of South Africa
Companies based in Cape Town
Internet properties established in 1999
1999 establishments in South Africa